The men's foil competition of the fencing event at the 2015 Southeast Asian Games was held on 4 June 2015 at the OCBC Arena Hall 2 in Singapore.

Schedule

Results

Pool round

Knockout round

Final standing

References

Men's foil